James A. Williams is an American labor leader and President of the International Union of Painters and Allied Trades (IUP). Williams is also the current Chairman of American Income Life Insurance Company's Labor Advisory Board.

He graduated from Northeast Catholic High School in Philadelphia, Pennsylvania in 1968. He served in the United States Army from 1969 to 1971 in the Vietnam War, where he was awarded two Bronze Stars, the Army Accommodation Medal, and an Air Medal. Upon his return home, he became a "journeyman glazier."

References

Activists from Philadelphia
American trade union leaders
Living people
Year of birth missing (living people)